Gabriella di Vergy is an opera seria in two acts by Gaetano Donizetti written in 1826 and revised in 1838, from a libretto by Andrea Leone Tottola, which was based on the tragedy Gabrielle de Vergy (1777) by Dormont De Belloy. Prior to that, the play was itself inspired by two French medieval legends, Le châtelain de Coucy et la dame de Fayel and Le Roman de la chastelaine de Vergy.

The story had already been the subject of an opera by Michele Carafa (1816) and had previously been used by Johann Simon Mayr (Raul di Créqui, Milan, 1809), Francesco Morlacchi (Raoul de Créqui, Dresden, 1811), and Carlo Coccia (Fayel, Florence, 1817). It was also subsequently used as Gabriella di Vergy by Saverio Mercadante in 1828.

"In its original form the opera was never performed", but parts of the original version were re-used by Donizetti in his other operas Otto mesi in due ore (Naples, 1827), L’esule di Roma (Naples 1828), Il paria (Naples 1829) and Anna Bolena. For the revised version, Donizetti revisited Gabriella di Vergy and incorporated into the opera parts of Ugo, conte di Parigi (Milan 1832), Rosmonda d'Inghilterra (Florence 1834) and Maria de Rudenz (Venice 1838).

Performance history
After Donizetti's death, his Gabriella di Vergy finally received its first performance on 29 November 1869 at the Teatro San Carlo in Naples with the title of Gabriella. However, the score was a rifacimento (re-doing), compiled by Giuseppe Puzone (who had been Donizetti's student) and Paolo Serrao. They combined elements from both the 1826 and 1838 versions as well as music from some of Donizetti's cantatas and his lesser-known operas.

The 1838 version of the opera was rediscovered in 1978 by Don White and Patric Schmid of Opera Rara. Subsequently, it was given its first performance in the UK on 9 September 1978 in Belfast and recorded. The first fully-staged UK performance was given by the Dorset Opera Festival on 31 August 1985.<ref=Dorset Opera Festival archive/>

Roles

Synopsis
Place: Burgundy
Time: Middle Ages

Gabriella has married Fayel under pressure from her father and the reported death of Raoul, the man she really loves on his return from the Crusades. She discovers too late that she had been deceived and that Raoul is alive. Raoul returns and accuses her of perfidy. Meanwhile, he is under pressure from the Emperor to marry Fayel's sister, Almeide. The story has a tragic and macabre end. Raoul is killed by Fayel in a duel. Fayel cuts out his heart and brings it to Gabriella in an urn. She goes mad and dies of a broken heart. Her final words to Fayel, and the final words of the opera are her wish for the foaming blood in the urn to rise up and cover Fayel's face and for Raoul's ghost to rise from its tomb to embed in Fayel's heart the knife he had used to cut out Raoul's.

Recordings

References
Notes

Sources
Allitt, John Stewart (1991), Donizetti: in the light of Romanticism and the teaching of Johann Simon Mayr, Shaftesbury: Element Books, Ltd (UK); Rockport, MA: Element, Inc.(USA)
Ashbrook, William (1982), Donizetti and His Operas, Cambridge University Press.  
Ashbrook, William (1998), "Donizetti, Gaetano" in Stanley Sadie  (Ed.),  The New Grove Dictionary of Opera, Vol. One. London: Macmillan Publishers, Inc.   
Ashbrook, William and Sarah Hibberd (2001), in  Holden, Amanda (Ed.), The New Penguin Opera Guide, New York: Penguin Putnam. .  pp. 224 – 247.
Loewenberg, Alfred (1970). Annals of Opera, 1597-1940, 2nd edition.  Rowman and Littlefield
Osborne, Charles, (1994),  The Bel Canto Operas of Rossini, Donizetti, and Bellini,  Portland, Oregon: Amadeus Press. 
Portinari, Folco (1981), Pari siamo! Io la lingua, egli ha il pugnale: storia del melodramma ottocentesco attraverso i suoi libretti. EDT srl, pp. 93–94. (In Italian) 
Sadie, Stanley, (Ed.); John Tyrell (Exec. Ed.) (2004), The New Grove Dictionary of Music and Musicians.  2nd edition. London: Macmillan.    (hardcover).   (eBook).
 Weinstock, Herbert (1963), Donizetti and the World of Opera in Italy, Paris, and Vienna in the First Half of the Nineteenth Century, New York: Pantheon Books.

External links
  Donizetti Society (London) website
 Libretto (Italian)

Operas by Gaetano Donizetti
Italian-language operas
Opera seria
Operas
1826 operas
Opera world premieres at the Teatro San Carlo
Operas set in France
Operas based on plays
Libretti by Andrea Leone Tottola